Christian Valétudie (born 27 May 1952 in Pointe-a-Pitre, Guadeloupe) is a French retired triple jumper.

Career 
Valétudie finished seventh at the 1974 European Indoor Championships, seventh at the 1975 European Indoor Championships, seventh at the 1976 European Indoor Championships, sixth at the 1977 European Indoor Championships, eleventh at the 1980 European Indoor Championships, and reached the final at the 1980 Summer Olympics without registering a valid mark there. Lastly he won the bronze medal at the 1983 Mediterranean Games.

His personal best jump was 16.80 metres, achieved in September 1979 in Rovereto.

References 

French male triple jumpers
Olympic athletes of France
French people of Guadeloupean descent
Living people
Athletes (track and field) at the 1980 Summer Olympics
1952 births
Guadeloupean athletes
Athletes (track and field) at the 1983 Mediterranean Games
Mediterranean Games bronze medalists for France
Mediterranean Games medalists in athletics